Alexandra Tessier (born 3 September 1993) is a Canadian rugby union player.

Rugby career 
Tessier competed for Canada at the 2017 Women's Rugby World Cup in Ireland. 

In 2022, Tessier started in a test-match against Wales, it was a warm-up ahead of the World Cup which Canada won 31–3. She was selected in Canada's squad for the delayed 2021 Rugby World Cup in New Zealand. She scored a try against the Eagles in their quarterfinal encounter. She then featured in the semifinal against England, and in the third place final against France.

References 

Living people
1993 births
Female rugby union players
Canadian female rugby union players
Canada women's international rugby union players